Vertou is a commune in the Loire-Atlantique department in western France.

It is located on the river Sèvre Nantaise, and was a historical town of Brittany.

Today, Vertou is a component of the Nantes Métropole and is the fifth-largest suburb of the city of Nantes, lying just southeast of Nantes. Vertou station has rail connections to Clisson and Nantes.

Population

Twin towns – sister cities

Vertou is twinned with:
 Morges, Switzerland
 Poděbrady, Czech Republic

See also
Communes of the Loire-Atlantique department

References

External links

 Official website 

Communes of Loire-Atlantique